Powiśle may refer to:

 Powiśle, Warsaw
 Powiśle, the working title for the Centrum Nauki Kopernik metro station in Powiśle
 Warszawa Powiśle railway station
 , a geographical region along the Vistula River in northern Poland